Furkan Özçal (born 3 September 1990) is a Turkish former footballer who played as an attacking midfielder.

Club career
He began his career with 1860 Munich, who play in the second tier of the German league, rising through the youth ranks. He was offered a professional contract and played one season with the club before signing a three-year contract with Kayserispor on 18 June 2008.

Galatasaray
Furkan was released by Kayserispor in the summer of 2012 and on 6 September 2012 he was then signed by Turkish giants Galatasaray on a free transfer.

On 18 July 2013, he left on loan to Karabükspor until the rest of the season. Furkan returned to Galatasaray after his impressive loan spell for the new season.

Honours
Galatasaray
Süper Lig (1): 2012–13

References

External links
 
 

1990 births
Living people
Turkish footballers
Turkey youth international footballers
Turkey under-21 international footballers
German footballers
German people of Turkish descent
Kayserispor footballers
Galatasaray S.K. footballers
Kardemir Karabükspor footballers
Bursaspor footballers
Ankaraspor footballers
Adanaspor footballers
Süper Lig players
Association football midfielders
Footballers from Munich